The 1979 Embassy World Darts Championship was the second World Professional Championships. Having been held the previous year at the Heart of the Midlands Club in Nottingham, the event moved to Jollees Cabaret Club in Stoke-on-Trent where it was to remain until 1985.

The tournament was held between 2 February and 9 February and had been expanded from 16 players to 24. The eight seeded players each received a bye into the second round. The format also changed from a straight matchplay (legs) to sets. Each set was the best of 5 legs. - For matches in the opening rounds the matches were best of three sets, - best of five for the quarter-finals and semi-finals, with the final being best of 9 sets, split over an afternoon and evening session with the play-off for third held in between.

Defending champion, Leighton Rees of Wales again progressed to the final where he met John Lowe in a repeat of the inaugural championship. This time, Lowe was the top seed and came out on top in the final by 5 sets to 0.

New players
With the expansion from 16 to 24 players in the finals, 11 players made their championship debuts, the most notable being John Wilson of Scotland, - no doubt to be soon known as Jocky. Wilson's performances over 1978 had enabled him to be seeded 8th for the tournament, and thus ensure a place in round 2 straight away.

Seeds
Wilson entering the seeds meant he would replace Rab Smith, the Scot having to play the first round before moving into the later stages. England's John Lowe had risen to be number 1 seed, with Eric Bristow dropping to 2nd seed after his first round defeat a year earlier. Leighton Rees remained seeded 3, with Tony Brown moving up to number 4. The Semi-Finalist from 1978 Nicky Virachkul was seeded 5th with the other Last 4-man, Stefan Lord seeded 6th. Alan Evans was the 7th seed along with Wilson as 8th.

  John Lowe
  Eric Bristow
  Leighton Rees
  Tony Brown
  Nicky Virachkul
  Stefan Lord
  Alan Evans
  Jocky Wilson

First round - Friday 2 and Saturday 3 February
The second Embassy World Championship opened up with the first surprise, Doug McCarthy's 2–1 win over Charlie Ellix. - McCarthy would meet Lowe in the last 16 later on in the event. Jim McQuillian, following Paddy Clifford as only the second Irishman to pay in the World Championship, looked comfortable in his 2–0 win over Murray Smith.

Prize money
Total Prize fund was £15,000 (plus a £12,000 bonus for a nine-dart finish - not won)
Champion £4,500
Runner-up £2,000
Third Place £1,500
Fourth Place £1,000
Quarter finalists £500
2nd round losers £300
1st round losers £200

Results

John Lowe won the final 5-0 (3-1, 3-0, 3-0, 3-2, 3-0) and thus became the 1979 BDO World Darts Champion. Illness prevented Alan Evans from playing the third-place match, so Tony Brown took third place by default.

References

BDO World Darts Championships
BDO World Darts 1979
Bdo World Darts Championship, 1979
Bdo World Darts Championship
BDO World Darts Championship